The 2022 Women's Challenge Cup (sponsored as the 2022 Betfred Women's Challenge Cup) was the 10th staging of the Rugby Football League's cup competition for women's rugby league clubs. The competition was won by St Helens who beat Leeds Rhinos 18–8 in the final at Elland Road on 7 May.

Format
The competition has a different format from previous years. Instead of being a straight knockout tournament, the first stage was played using a single round-robin format with the top two teams from four groups advancing to the quarter-final stage, at which point knockout format was resumed.

Entry was limited to the 12 teams of the Women's Super League plus three Championship teams; Hull FC, Oulton Raidettes and Widnes Vikings; together with the Army women's team. Each team was seeded into one of four pots with one team from each pot being drawn into each group.

On 6 March 2022 Widnes Vikings withdrew from the competition and were replaced by another Championship side, Dewsbury Moor.

Group stage
The draw for the group stages was made on 7 December at Elland Road, Leeds. Making the draw were footballers Jermaine Beckford and Gemma Bonner.

Group A

Group B

Group C

Group D

Quarter-finals
The quarter-finals are scheduled for the weekend of 9/10 April.  The teams topping each group will have home advantage in the quarter-finals.

Semi-finals
The draw for the semi-finals was made on 10 April with the matches played on 24 April as a double header at Warrington's Halliwell Jones Stadium.

Final
The final was played at Elland Road, Leeds on Saturday 7 May 2022. The match formed part of a triple-header with the semi-finals of the men's Challenge Cup. The attendance of 5,888 was a new record attendance for a women's rugby league match in Great Britain.

Teams
St Helens: 
Backs:Rebecca Rotheram, Eboni Partington, Amy Hardcastle, Carrie Roberts, Leah Burke, Beth Stott, Zoe Harris
Forwards:Isabelle Rudge, Tara Jones, Chantelle Crowl, Paige Travis, Naomi Williams, Jodie Cunningham
Interchanges: Vicky Whitfield, Alice Sandham, Emily Rudge, Rachael Woosey

Leeds:
Backs:Fran Goldthorp, Tasha Gaines, Hanna Butcher, Caitlin Beevers, Samantha Hulme, Georgia Roche, Courtney Winfield-Hill
Forwards:Dannielle Anderson, Keara Bannett, Aimee Staveley, Chloe Kerrigan, Elychia Watson, Zoe Hornby
Interchanges:Emma Lumley, Shannon Lacey, Orla McCallion, Alex Barnes

Broadcast matches

See also
 2022 Men's Challenge Cup

Notes

References

RFL Women's Challenge Cup
Challenge Cup
rugby league
Challenge Cup